Antonios Bonas (born 29 January 1948) is a Greek sailor. He competed at the 1972 Summer Olympics and the 1976 Summer Olympics.

References

External links
 

1948 births
Living people
Greek male sailors (sport)
Olympic sailors of Greece
Sailors at the 1972 Summer Olympics – Flying Dutchman
Sailors at the 1976 Summer Olympics – 470
Sailors (sport) from Piraeus